Aaron Wolf may refer to:

 Aaron Wolf (director), American actor, writer and director
 Aaron Wolf (judoka) (born 1996), Japanese judoka